Robert Michael Payton (25 May 1944 13 July 1994) was an American marketing man, restaurateur and hotelier.  He is known for starting a chain of American-style restaurants in London in the 1970s, starting with The Chicago Pizza Pie Factory.

Payton was born in Miami, Florida.

He attended the University of North Carolina at Chapel Hill, in Chapel Hill, North Carolina, and later received a master's degree in business administration from Northwestern University in Evanston, Illinois.

When sent to England by J. Walter Thompson to promote Kraft products, he decided to stay. He opened several successful fast food outlets such as Chicago Pizza Pie Factories and a series of themed restaurants such as Rib Shacks, Chicago Meatpackers and Henry J. Bean's. In 1988 he bought Stapleford Park, a large Leicestershire country house, and converted it into a hotel.

Death
He died at age 50, in an automobile accident near Stevenage, Hertfordshire, England.

See also

 List of people from Miami, Florida
 List of people who died in road accidents

References

1944 births
1994 deaths
20th-century American businesspeople
American expatriates in England
American food company founders
American restaurateurs
American hoteliers
20th-century American Jews
Businesspeople from Miami
Kellogg School of Management alumni
Restaurant founders
Road incident deaths in England
University of North Carolina at Chapel Hill alumni